Banque Pharaon & Chiha S.A.L. was a Lebanese bank, founded in 1876, and headquartered in Achrafieh, Beirut. The bank was founded by Antoine Chiha during the Lebanese Ottoman era. It was one of the oldest Lebanese banks that were still operating in the recent years.

The bank was acquired by Byblos Bank in 2016.

See also
Henri Philippe Pharaoun
List of Banks in Lebanon

References

1876 establishments in the Ottoman Empire
Banks established in 1876
Banks of Lebanon